Phlebia serialis is a species of fungus belonging to the family Meruliaceae.

It is native to Eurasia and Northern America.

References

Meruliaceae